The Irish Film Archive is part of the Irish Film Institute (formed in 1943, incorporated in 1945) the body charged with the promotion and preservation of film culture in Ireland.

It collects, preserves and makes accessible Ireland's moving image heritage. It is the leading resource for students of Irish film and film history. Its collection includes 20,000 cans of film, 5,000 tapes, the Tiernan MacBride reference library and over 30,000 stills, posters and documents. The collection reflects Irish film production for over a century, with material from 1897 to the present day held in climate controlled vaults in Dublin's cultural quarter, Temple Bar. The collection  incorporates fiction, features, public information films, amateur material, documentaries, newsreels, experimental film and animation

Regular screenings of material from the collections are held at the Irish Film Institute and at other venues in Ireland and abroad. The Archive also facilitates national and international non-competitive festivals showing Irish film and curates the IFI International touring programme of Irish film. It is a resource for those interested in Ireland's film heritage and is used regularly by academics, students, teachers, film-makers, researchers, film enthusiasts and the general public. The Archive is a member of The International Federation of Film Archives (FIAF).

Collection
There are a lot of films, Irish history, older programmes and adverts on film. Among the old adverts are for Club Orange, Penny's, Jacob's, HB Ice Cream and Allied Irish Bank that were shown during the 1960s, 1970s and 1980s. There is old Irish history from through the years what events shaped the whole island of Ireland of course from late 19th or early 20th century on words some older programmes shown on RTÉ are available on it from 1960s and 1970s decades and celebrations. There is a television advert for Avonmore Milk with the first television appearance of Miriam O'Callaghan from the early 1980s.

Most RTE programmes between 1961 and March 6, 1985 including Weather, News, The Angelus and clips will be online from December 2021 to celebrate 60 years of television in Ireland.

References

External links 
IFA website

Film archives in the Republic of Ireland
FIAF-affiliated institutions